Pleiarthrocerus is a genus of beetles in the subfamily Cerambycinae, containing the single species Pleiarthrocerus opacus. It is the only genus of the tribe Pleiarthrocerini.

References

Cerambycinae
Monotypic beetle genera